Ronojoy Sen (born 1969) is an Indian political scientist and author. He is a Senior Research Fellow at the Institute of South Asian Studies and the South Asian Studies Programme, National University of Singapore. Sen has been a Visiting Fellow with the National Endowment for Democracy, Washington, D.C., the East-West Center, Washington, and Fellow of the International Olympic Museum, Lausanne, Switzerland.

In an interview, Sen said he was born and raised in Calcutta and he read history at Presidency College, Kolkata.

He has also delivered lectures at leading institutions like Harvard University, University of California, Berkeley & University of California, Los Angeles

Books

References 

Living people